Let Yet Kone is a village in Ye-U District, Sagaing Region of Myanmar. Let Yet Kone has about 3,000 villagers living in 400 houses. Most villagers in Let Yet Kone are rice or peanut farmers.

Massacre 

On 16 September 2022, Myanmar Air Force's two helicopters fired machine guns and heavier weapons at a monastic school in Let Yet Kone, killing 7 children and injuring 17 others. In addition, the ground column attacked the village after the air attack. After the attack, about 30 children were wounded and 20 children and three teachers were taken way by soldiers.

References 

Populated places in Sagaing Region